Wissahickon Creek is a tributary of the Schuylkill River in Montgomery and Philadelphia Counties, Pennsylvania.

Wissahickon Creek rises in Montgomery County, runs approximately  passing through and dividing Northwest Philadelphia before emptying into the Schuylkill River at Philadelphia.

Much of the creek now runs through or next to parkland, with the last few miles running through a deep gorge. The beauty of this area attracted the attention of literary personages like Edgar Allan Poe and John Greenleaf Whittier. The gorge area is now part of Wissahickon Valley Park in Philadelphia, and the Wissahickon Valley is known as one of 600 National Natural Landmarks of the United States.

The name of the creek comes from the Lenape word wiessahitkonk, for "catfish creek" or "stream of yellowish color."
On the earliest map of this region of Pennsylvania, by Thomas Holme, the stream is called Whitpaine's creek, after one of the original settlers Richard Whitpaine, who owned several large tracts on the creek.  
Whitpaine was an early land owner in the days of William Penn.

Industry sprang up along the Wissahickon not long after European settlement, with America's first paper mill set up on one of the Wissahickon's tributaries. A few of the dams built for the mills remain visible today.

Geography and recreation

Its dramatic geography and dense forest attract thousands of walkers, riders, and bikers.

The most popular trail for exploring the lower Wissahickon valley is Forbidden Drive (officially known as Wissahickon Drive), a gravel road that follows the Wissahickon Creek from Lincoln Drive to the County Line. It received its familiar name in the 1920s when automobiles were first banned from the road. Bicyclists and equestrians may use Forbidden Drive without a permit. Other trails in the area are more restricted, with some prohibiting cyclists or equestrians, and others requiring a permit for bicyclists and equestrians. All users of the park are asked to stay on marked trails to protect against erosion.

A paved path on the west bank connects the junction of Forbidden Drive and Lincoln Drive south to Ridge Avenue at the confluence of the Wissahickon and Schuylkill River. This path is a popular access point for cyclists coming off the River Drive bike paths to Center City Philadelphia, or for pedestrians departing the Manayunk/Norristown Line transit route at Wissahickon Station or Bus Interchange.

Forbidden Drive is also accessible at its midpoint at the Valley Green Inn. Valley Green Road can be reached from Springfield Avenue in Chestnut Hill, two blocks west of St. Martin's Lane and the St. Martin's railroad station on the Chestnut Hill West Line. Just above Valley Green, Wise's Mill Road meets Forbidden Drive, connecting it to Henry Avenue in Roxborough. Wise's Mill Road may be the same as that described in Edgar Allan Poe's 1844 story "Morning on the Wissahiccon": "I would advise the adventurer who would behold its finest points to take the Ridge Road, running westwardly from the city, and, having reached the second lane beyond the sixth mile-stone, to follow this lane to its termination. He will thus strike the Wissahiccon, at one of its best reaches ...". Forbidden Drive ends at Northwestern Avenue (which is the county line) after crossing Bell's Mill Road.

A number of trails climb out of the valley from Forbidden Drive to the "upper trails" which run along the precipitous walls of the valley. Many of these upper trails have been marked with colored blazes. The green blazed trail has been designated a multi-use trail approved for mountain bikers with permits. The blue blazed trail has been designated a hiking trail only. All trails in the Andorra Natural Area are prohibited to all bicycles. The orange trail parallels the creek on its east bank, and while it has fewer rolling hills than the park's other trails, it is often much steeper and rockier. It is accessible only by foot.

Several hiking and biking trails follow the creek along most of its course, including the 12-mile long Green Ribbon Trail from North Wales to Flourtown, and the developed Wissahickon Trail in Wissahickon Valley Park. There are plans to combine these trails into a continuous 20-mile multi-use route to be called the Wissahickon Trail, following the creek from near its origin in Lansdale to its outlet at the Schuylkill River.

Devil's Pool is an attraction best reached from Valley Green by crossing the stream and taking the footpath on the eastern bank, going downstream to the mouth of the Cresheim Creek. As the ravine widens into the Cresheim, the waters gather in a basin surrounded on either side by rocky outcroppings before flowing into the Wissahickon Creek. Legend has it that the Native American Lenape tribes used this as a spiritual area, where local author Phyllis Knapp Thomas writes that "...the Good Spirit is claimed to have banished the Evil Spirit into deep, dark waters." Although it is not legal due to unsafe levels of pollutants, Devil's pool has become a popular area to swim, lounge, and drink. Unfortunately, Devil's pool often falls victim to litter and vandalism. However, recent efforts to clean the site by the Friends of the Wissahickon have been moderately successful.

One of the most romantic hikes in this park leads to a precipice overlooking the gorge. It can be found by entering the main footpath at the Ridge Avenue entrance and following the west bank to Hermit's Lane Bridge. Coming from Blue Stone Bridge, follow the path at the west end to Lover's Leap.

Another outlook in the park is Mom Rinker's Rock, on a ridge on the eastern side of the Park just north of the Walnut Lane Bridge, close by the Toleration statue. Here on a moonlit night in May 1847, George Lippard, romancer of the Wissahickon, was married to his frail young wife according to so-called Indian rites. Years afterward in 1883, the Toleration statue was erected, a marble statue of a man in simple Quaker clothing. Atop Mom Rinker's Rock, the nine-foot-eight-inch statue has the single word "Toleration" carved into its four-foot-three-inch base. Created by late 19th-century sculptor Herman Kirn, it was brought to the site by landowner John Welsh, reported to have purchased the statue at the Centennial Exposition in Philadelphia. Welsh, a former Fairmount Park Commissioner and U.S. Ambassador to Britain, donated his land to the Park prior to his death in 1886.

(The statue is popularly but erroneously known as "Teedyuscung," the name of an 18th-century Delaware chief.) Commissioned by Mr. and Mrs. Charles W. Henry, it is a tribute to the Lenape Indians who hunted and fished in the Wissahickon prior to the arrival of colonists. The statue can also be viewed from Forbidden Drive across the creek if one stands just north of the path to the Rex Avenue Bridge.

Geology
A tremendous variety of geology is evident along Wissahickon Creek. Three of the geologic regions that the stream passes through are the Newark Basin of Triassic sandstone and shale, the limestone and dolomite of the Chester Valley, and the Wissahickon Formation where the waters of the stream flow into the Schuylkill and eventually the Delaware Rivers.

A unique and very distinctive rock of the Wissahickon Creek valley is Wissahickon schist, the predominant bedrock underlying the Philadelphia region, found over a broad swath of southeastern Pennsylvania from Trenton into Delaware and Maryland. This Precambrian to Cambrian stone, first studied in the Wissahickon gorge, has flecks of glittery mica, small garnets, and many-toned shadings of gray, brown, tan, and blue, and is attractive enough to have become a common building material in the 19th and early 20th centuries.

In addition to Wissahickon schist, there are layers of quartzite in the valley. Both schist and quartzite are metamorphic rocks formed from sedimentary deposits of mud and sand that one time were washed from ancient continents into a shallow sea. These sedimentary deposits were over time compressed into shale and sandstone. During long periods of mountain building, the shale and sandstone were slowly transformed into the schist and quartzite found today. In some places, the compression and heat were extreme enough to fuse the schist with emerging igneous rocks into hard-banded gneiss.

Other rocks in the valley are layers of igneous pegmatite and remains of granite plutons, embedded crystals within the schist. A few locations close to Devil's Pool and along Bell's Mill Road have a talc schist which contains the mineral talc, so soft it can be scratched with a fingernail.

Tributaries

Trewellyn Creek
Willow Run
Prophecy Creek
Sandy Run
Sunny Brook
Lorraine Run
Arlingham Run
Cresheim Creek
Gorgas Run
Carpenter's Run
Paper Mill Run

History

Johannes Kelpius

In 1694, Johannes Kelpius arrived in Philadelphia with a group of like-minded German Pietists to live in the valley of the Wissahickon Creek. They formed a monastic community and became known as the Hermits or Mystics of the Wissahickon. Kelpius was a musician, writer, and occultist. He frequently meditated (some believe in a cave—the Cave of Kelpius ) along the banks of the Wissahickon and awaited the end of the world, which was expected in 1694. No sign or revelation accompanied that year, but the faithful continued to live in celibacy by the stream, searching the stars and hoping for the end. Kelpius described the type of meditation he used in his Method of Prayer. (See Further Reading below on this book.) Kelpius died in 1708 and the group disbanded some time thereafter. Some members likely gave up on celibacy and married. A few joined the somewhat like-minded religious colony of Ephrata Cloister under Conrad Beissel in Ephrata, Lancaster County, even though no previous connection existed between the two communities. At least two from the original group, Johann Seelig and Konrad Matthaei, continued as hermits along the Wissahickon into the 1740s.

Other religious groups were also associated with the Wissahickon: On Christmas Day in 1723 the first congregation of the Church of the Brethren in America – often called Dunkard Brethren – baptized several new members in the stream. Around 1747 an individual with connections to both the Dunkards and the Ephrata Cloister built a stone house on land previously owned by Dunkards. The structure, used for church retreats, still stands today, and is known as The Monastery, a remaining witness to the Wissahickon's days as an isolated religious refuge.

Development

The same steep slopes and gorge that provided an attractive isolation to religious adherents in the 17th and early 18th centuries provided an efficient source of energy for the development of water mills in later years. One miller had by 1690 already constructed a dam, sawmill, gristmill, and house by the narrow shelf of land at the confluence of the Wissahickon with the Schuylkill River, but the rugged terrain of the valley forestalled further development alongside the stream itself. By 1730, however, eight mills had been constructed, and by 1793, twenty-four, along with many dams. Most of America was still wilderness, but the Wissahickon Valley was a developing industrial center. There were more than fifty watermills by 1850, though the thickly forested region about the stream still retained the character of a wilderness. Access roads were being constructed into the steep valley, but there was still no road that followed the stream itself. The nature of the rugged terrain can be comprehended in an event that had occurred during the Revolutionary War Battle of Germantown, which was fought not too far from the stream. The American General John Armstrong, compelled by the rough terrain to abandon a cannon in the valley, expressed his contempt for the "horrendous hills of the Wissahickon." Later legends tell of American spies taking advantage of the terrain to retrieve information from an informant named Mom Rinker, who allegedly perched atop a rock overlooking the valley to drop balls of yarn which contained messages about British troop movements during the occupation of Philadelphia. This is likely a legend, for other stories speak of a witch named Mom Rinkle who had little to do with the Revolution. There is a Mom Rinker's Rock in the park today.

Not until 1826 were the cliffs near the creek's mouth blasted away to provide access to the cluster of mills at Rittenhousetown, approximately  up the creek on Paper Mill Run (also known as Monoshone Creek), a small tributary of the Wissahickon. Here William Rittenhouse (grandfather of the astronomer David Rittenhouse) had in the early 18th century built the first paper mill in America. Gradually this road and other mill access roads were connected, and in 1856 a private toll road, the Wissahickon Turnpike, linked the entire valley. Long gone were the religious mystics; here instead the mills of Wissahickon Creek made paper, cloth, gunpowder, sawed lumber, milled wheat and corn, and pressed oil from flax. A sizable population worked at the mills and lived in the valley in small villages like Rittenhousetown and Pumpkinville. The nation was becoming an industrial nation, and the Wissahickon was leading the way.

Benjamin Franklin already had noted in his will the high elevation and quality of Wissahickon water, proposing that in some future day the stream be dammed to supply a safe and pure water source for Philadelphia's water supply, and even allocating funds for this purpose. This did not happen, but the quest for pure water affected the Wissahickon's subsequent history. Seeking to prevent the stream's industrial discharges from affecting the purity of the water of the Schuylkill River, the Fairmount Park Commission took title of much of the land along the Wissahickon in 1869-1870, and continued to expand its holdings in subsequent decades. The mills were razed; the last active mill was demolished in 1884. Several decades later the Schuylkill River itself became seriously polluted by sources in the coal fields far upstream beyond Philadelphia's control, but the waters of the Wissahickon had been restored and the beauty of the Wissahickon Valley had been preserved. Most of America became more industrialized, but the Wissahickon valley quietly returned to its original wilderness character.

The reason the Wissahickon Valley retained its wilderness character, even after its clean waters were no longer essential to the water supply of the city of Philadelphia, was the advent of Romanticism and the changing attitudes which this thought engendered about nature. Before the 19th century, nature had seemed a capricious and ambivalent force, at times a dream, but at times a nightmare. Nature, according to orthodox Christian thought, had fallen with man; though the Renaissance brought about both a new view of mankind and nature, this new attitude took time to grow, but it eventually resulted in a literary and artistic movement known as Romanticism. Romantics valued heroism and chivalry in people, and regarded the wild, free, and untamed nature as the "natural" model of true beauty. Philadelphians finally came to value their Wissahickon valley for its wild character. Even when the mills were still operating, there were remote stretches of wild bluffs and overarching trees; now the old mills had become romantic and picturesque, with mossy stone walls suggesting medieval ruins. In 1924, area residents formed the non-profit group "Friends of the Wissahickon", which still works to maintain the park's unique landscape to this day. Remarks on the Wissahickon in literature by such as Fanny Kemble, Edgar Allan Poe, George Lippard, and others are noted below.

However much the stream and its valley were appreciated, it still divided parts of the city. To help overcome this, in 1906 the Walnut Lane Bridge was built over the stream, which was the world's largest concrete arch bridge at the time. The bridge joined the Roxborough and Germantown neighborhoods of Philadelphia, formerly separated by the Wissahickon gorge.

Wissahickon Day 
In the past, there was an annual parade of horses, riders, and carriage annually in May for Wissahickon Day, a festive Gala popular among Philadelphia's Equestrians and social elites.

Wissahickon Memorial Bridge

The Wissahickon Memorial Bridge, also known as Henry Avenue Bridge, is a stone and concrete bridge that carries Henry Avenue over Wissahickon Creek, joining Roxborough and the East Falls-Germantown neighborhoods in Philadelphia. It was originally designed to carry a planned extension of a subway into Roxborough, but the subway never reached the bridge. The bridge has been known as a suicide bridge since its opening. Beginning in 1941 for an unknown duration of time a policeman patrolled the span, questioning all pedestrians walking the bridge.

Fairmount Park

Once the stream enters the city of Philadelphia, the creek valley and its deeply wooded gorge form part of the Fairmount Park system in Philadelphia, a jewel of a park and of nature set in the middle of an urban landscape. The park here is a ruggedly beautiful valley for the naturalists, artists, fishermen, bicyclists, equestrians, and hikers who are drawn to the wooded, steep banks of the stream. There are two main and many smaller bridle paths crossing the park's  along the Wissahickon Creek. Thomas Mill Covered Bridge, the only covered bridge in a major US city, spans the creek in the park. The Wissahickon Valley is one of fewer than 600 National Natural Landmarks in America. Recently, interest in reintroducing brook trout to the Wissahickon Valley portion of Fairmount park has been growing.

References in culture

Literature
Among the earliest references to the valley was by William Cobbett in his book Rural Rides, which takes the form of a series of letters. In one dated 1821 he said,

Actress Fanny Kemble, grandmother to novelist Owen Wister, visited the stream in 1832; her writing awakened a more general interest in the stream and its valley. Her description of the gorge's dramatic end at the stream's confluence with the Schuylkill River and her verse To the Wissahickon both sparked a keen interest in this natural treasure often overlooked by its neighbors. She wrote:

The thick, bright, rich-tufted cedars, basking in the warm amber glow, the picturesque mill, the smooth open field, along whose side the river waters, after receiving this child of the mountains into their bosom, wound deep, and bright, and still, the whole radiant with the softest light I ever beheld, formed a most enchanting and serene subject of contemplation.

Edgar Allan Poe alluded to Fanny Kemble's writing in his description of a beautiful Wissahickon valley in his 1844 essay "Morning on the Wissahiccon", in which he wrote:

Now the Wissahiccon is of so remarkable a loveliness that, were it flowing in England, it would be the theme of every bard, and the common topic of every tongue, if, indeed, its banks were not parcelled off in lots, at an exorbitant price, as building-sites for the villas of the opulent. Yet it is only within a very few years that any one has more than heard of the Wissahiccon ... the brook is narrow. Its banks are generally, indeed almost universally, precipitous, and consist of high hills, clothed with noble shrubbery near the water, and crowned at a greater elevation, with some of the most magnificent forest trees of America, among which stands conspicuous the liriodendron tulipiferum. The immediate shores, however, are of granite, sharply defined or moss-covered, against which the pellucid water lolls in its gentle flow, as the blue waves of the Mediterranean upon the steps of her palaces of marble.

The erratic and almost forgotten novelist George Lippard frequently wrote about the Wissahickon, and was even married at sunset on or around May 14, 1847, on a rocky crag called Mom Rinker's Rock, overlooking the stream. One of his books, The Rose of Wissahikon; or, The Fourth of July, 1776. A Romance, Embracing the Secret History of the Declaration of Independence (1847) may refer not only to the Wissahickon, but to his wife, the former Rose Newman. He wrote:

A poem of everlasting beauty and a dream of magnificance – the world-hidden, wood embowered Wissahickon.

Depending on one of Lippard's mostly contrived stories, John Greenleaf Whittier wrote about Johannes Kelpius and his followers on the Wissahickon in his 1872 poem Pennsylvania Pilgrim:

Christopher Morley also portrayed the valley's beauty in his writings.

The Wissahickon is mentioned very briefly in A Biography of the Poet, Sidney Lanier by Edwin Mims.

Mark Twain mentioned the Wissahickon during the short time he spent in Philadelphia working for The Philadelphia Inquirer: "Unlike New York, I like this Philadelphia amazingly, and the people in it ... I saw small steamboats, with their signs up—"For Wissahickon and Manayunk 25 cents." Geo. Lippard, in his Legends of Washington and his Generals, has rendered the Wissahickon sacred in my eyes, and I shall make that trip, as well as one to Germantown, soon ..."

Ron P. Swegman, a fly fishing angler, artist, and author, wrote extensively about Wissahickon Creek in two illustrated essay collections, Philadelphia on the Fly (Frank Amato Publications, 2005) and Small Fry: The Lure of the Little (The Whitefish Press, 2009). Both books describe the Wissahickon Valley and the experience of fly fishing along Wissahickon Creek in the early twenty-first century.

Art

Artists have portrayed the stream and its valley:
 Johan Mengels Culverhouse, Skating on the Wissahickon River Near Philadelphia, 1875
 John Exillus, Conrad's Paper-mill on the Wissahickon, abt 1813 (mentioned in Thomas Morton's History of Pennsylvania Hospital)
 Daniel Charles Grose, Spring on the Whissahickon and Autumn on the Whissahickon located at the Samuel Dorksy Museum of Art, State University of New York at New Paltz
 J. S. Hill, Through the Winter Woods Near the Wissahickon, 1874
 Charles W. Knapp, Boating on the Wissahickon, 1870
 John Moran, Devil's Glen in the Wissahickon, 1888
 John Moran, The Falls of Wissahickon Creek at Ridge Ave., 1888
 Thomas Moran (1837–1926), Autumn on the Wissahickon
 Thomas Moran (1837–1926), Cresheim Glen, Wissahickon, Autumn, 1864
 Thomas Moran (1837–1926), On the Wissahickon Near Chestnut Hill, 1870
 James Peale (1749–1831), View on the Wissahickon, 1828
 James Peale (1749–1831), View on the Wissahickon, 1830 (at the Philadelphia Museum of Art)
 James Peale (1749–1831), Wissahickon, n.d. (at Swarthmore College)
 James Peale (1749–1831), On the Wissahickon, 1830
 James Peale (1749–1831), View of the Wissahickon (waterfall)
 William Trost Richards (1833–1905), On the Wissahickon, 1870
 William Trost Richards (1833–1905), The Wissahickon, 1872
 William Thompson Russell Smith (1812–1896), Boating Party on the Wissahickon, 1836
 William Thompson Russell Smith (1812–1896), Rocks on the Wissahickon, 1839
 William Thompson Russell Smith (1812–1896), A Scene on the Wissahickon, 1842
 William Thompson Russell Smith (1812–1896), Wissahickon, 1857
 Thomas Sully (1783–1872), Wissahickon Creek, 1845
 Ron P. swegman (1967- ), Philadelphia on the Fl, 2005
 Rosa M. Towne (1827–1909), Sketch of Upper Wissahickon, Philadelphia, 1882
 Carl Philipp Weber, (Amer, b Germ, 1849–1921), Wissahickon Scene, n.d.
 Carl Philipp Weber, (Amer, b Germ, 1849–1921), Wissahickon Creek, 1877
 Carl Philipp Weber, (Amer, b Germ, 1849–1921), Spirit of the Wissahickon (lower bridge, Wissahickon valley)

There exists a Currier & Ives Scenery Of The Wissahickon

The Swann Memorial Fountain (1924), a fountain sculpture by Alexander Stirling Calder that is located in the center of Logan Circle, also known by its historic name Logan Square, in Philadelphia, contains three large Native American figures that symbolize the area's major streams: the Delaware, the Schuylkill, and the Wissahickon. The young girl leaning on her side against an agitated, water-spouting swan represents the Wissahickon Creek.

Music
There exists a song called "The Gentle Wissahickon: A Ballad" published in 1857 by Edmund L Walker, 142 Chestnut Street, Philadelphia. The words are by Col. James G Wallace, the music by Herman Trevor, and it recalls a "happy childhood time", "the picnic grove", and at the end "dear Alice Ray" who became the singer's "blushing bride."

There exists sheet music mentioning the Wissahickon:
 The Wissahickon Waltz by Charles Grobe, 1849 (2 pages)
 The Wissahickon Gallopade by J. B. Bishop, 1856 (4 pages)
 Sounds from the Wissahickon waltzes by Harry M. Rollin, 1871 (10 pages).

"Wissahickon Drive" is the name of one of the tracks on the CD Here's to You by the Bog Wanderers, "a collection of original, contemporary and traditional slides, jigs, reels, waltzes and songs." Liner notes say the tune is "of the great fiddler/composer Liz Carroll."

Motion pictures
In the 1981 Brian DePalma–directed film Blow Out starring Nancy Allen and John Travolta, the car crash that Travolta's character records is of an auto traveling northbound on Lincoln Drive and crashing headfirst into the Wissahickon Creek. The site is just south of the intersection of Lincoln Drive and Forbidden Drive. Travolta's character plays his recorded film footage repeatedly, and the creek's location is easy to determine.

Portions of the 2010 M. Night Shyamalan film The Last Airbender were filmed in the Wissahickon Valley Park.

Military
The USS Wissahickon, a U.S. Navy gunboat during the Civil War and the USRC Wissahickon, a U.S. Revenue Cutter Service harbor tug were named after the creek.

See also

Wissahickon Valley Park
List of rivers of Pennsylvania

References

Further reading
 Contosta, David and Franklin, Carol. Metropolitan Paradise: The Struggle for Nature in the City. Philadelphia's Wissahickon Valley, 1620-2020. St. Joseph's University Press, 2010.  Available from Friends of the Wissahickon and St. Joseph's University Press 
 Brandt, Francis Burke. Wissahickon Valley within the city of Philadelphia. Philadelphia: Corn Exchange National Bank, 1927. Entire book is available for download from the Penn State Digital Library at this site.
 Conwill, Joseph D. "The Wissahickon Valley: To A Wilderness Returned." Pennsylvania Heritage. Summer, 1986.
 Grove, Victor. Philadelphia: A Hiker's Paradise. Philadelphia, PA: Old City Publishing, 2005.  (Contains many photos of Wissahickon Creek and area)
 Herman, Andrew Mark. Along the Wissahickon Creek. Arcadia Publishing, 2004. 
 Kelpius, Johannes, and Richards, Kirby, Ph.D. A Method of Prayer. A Mystical Pamphlet from Colonial America. Philadelphia: Schuylkill Wordsmiths, 2006. (A new translation of Kelpius's pamphlet, with informative background materials and the original German. Available at Amazon.com.)
 Swegman, Ron P. Philadelphia on the Fly. Frank Amato Publications, 2005. 
 Swegman, Ron P. Small Fry: The Lure of the Little. The Whitefish Press, 2009.

External links

Friends of the Wissahickon website
U.S. Geological Survey: PA stream gaging stations
Historic RittenhouseTown
WRV Wissahickon Restoration Volunteers
A virtual geologic tour of Wissahickon Creek
1871 map
1876 map
Bird's eye view lithograph, old photos, building plans, Edison letter, etc. (need to enter Wissahickon into search box)
Postcard collection with several Wissahickon views
Legend of the Wissahikon
Edgar Allan Poe's 1844 sketch "Morning on the Wissahiccon"
Monks of Wissahickon
The Legend of Wissahickon 
At the Red Bridge Crossing the Wissahickon Creek by D.J. Kennedy, Historical Society of Pennsylvania
Catfish and Waffles

National Natural Landmarks in Pennsylvania
Rivers of Montgomery County, Pennsylvania
Rivers of Pennsylvania
Rivers of Philadelphia
Tributaries of the Schuylkill River
Wissahickon Valley Park